Gregoire is a surname and given name.

Gregoire may also refer to:

Places
 Gregoire Lake (disambiguation)
 Gregoire River, a river in Alberta, Canada
 Lake Gregoire, a fluvial lake on the Faucher River in Mauricie, Quebec, Canada

Other uses
 Gregoire (chimpanzee) (1942–2008)
 Gregoire (film), a Canadian film
 Automobiles Grégoire, a French automotive company
 Hotchkiss Grégoire, a French automobile

See also

 
 Saint-Grégoire (disambiguation)
 Gregor (disambiguation)
 Gregores (disambiguation)
 Gregory (disambiguation)
 Greg (disambiguation)